Big Island Park (commonly referred to as Big Island Amusement Park) was a popular tourist destination that existed near Minneapolis, Minnesota between 1906 and 1911 on Lake Minnetonka's Big Island. Today the property is a municipal nature park owned by the City of Orono, sometimes referred to as Big Island Nature Park to distinguish it from the former amusement park.

History

Conception 

The Twin Cities of Minneapolis-Saint Paul once boasted one of the most extensive streetcar systems in the United States with lines reaching 20 miles in either direction from the downtown area. At its height in the early twentieth century, lines reached the suburbs of Stillwater in the east and Tonka Bay in the west. The announcement was part of TCRT Chairman Thomas Lowry's master plan to attract tourists and excursionists to the edge of the system on summer weekends, when ridership was typically low. The company was already operating another amusement park called Wildwood near the eastern end of the system on White Bear Lake.

Big Island Park opened on August 5, 1906, with construction still underway.

Amenities 

A total of 10,000 or more persons typically visited Big Island Park each weekend with good weather. Since Big Island Park was located on an island, TCRT had to build three 1,000-passenger ferry boats and a transfer terminal in the town of Excelsior to efficiently carry the visitors to and from mainland. TCRT's Express Boats also provided limited service to Big Island Park, but only on rare occasions.

To lodge overnight visitors, TCRT purchased the dilapidated Lake Park Hotel in Tonka Bay, renovated it, and reopened it as the Tonka Bay Hotel.

TCRT had commissioned LeRoy Buffington, a prominent local architect, to design Big Island Park's structures in the Mission Revival style of architecture. Many of the park's buildings, including a  light beacon modeled after the Tower of Seville, were equipped with electric lights. The light cast from the top of the beacon could purportedly be spotted from downtown Minneapolis on a clear night, approximately 15 miles away.

A 1,500-seat music casino was completed in 1907 to serve as the park's premier entertainment center. Among the biggest acts to perform at the casino were the New York band and orchestra of Frederick Innes and the Banda Rossa Orchestra under the direction Eugenio Sorrentino. Most headliners, however, were local.

Other attractions at Big Island Park included a roller coaster, a carousel, boat rentals, a log flume-type ride called the Old Mill, and another ride called the Scenic Ride Through Yellowstone Park. The park was also known for its fine picnic facilities.

Closure 

Due to excessive operating costs and lack of revenue during the off-season, TCRT closed Big Island Park in August 1911 and abandoned the property shortly thereafter. Most of the buildings and rides were dismantled over the winter of 1917-1918. Rebar within the structures was smelted down and used for the World War I effort.

Big Island Park Today 

The property was eventually sold to several veteran associations and used as a campground for nearly 80 years. After the campground closed in 2003, the City of Orono purchased the property for $5.7 million and reopened it as a municipal nature park in 2006. Today there are very few remnants of the original amusement park left on the island, namely several foundations, a ditch that once contained the Old Mill ride, and the remains of the grand entrance, also referred to as "The Mall." Camping and alcohol are not allowed on the premises, but picnics, hiking, and other recreational activities are encouraged. A public dock is located at the site of the original steamboat wharf.

Big Island's first and only school, the Big Island Summer Institute, was established in 2006. The program was forced to relocate, however, after a fire destroyed the facility in 2011.

See also 

 Lake Minnetonka
 Minnehaha (steamboat)
 Minnesota Streetcar Museum
 Trolley park

External links 
Big Island Archaeology Report  at Internet Archive
Amusement parks of the Twin Cities 
Big Island Park in Orono, Minnesota.
Big Island History at Steamboat Minnehaha.
Photos
Big Island Park at the Hennepin County Library.
Big Island Park at the Minnesota Historical Society.
The Library Of Congress
Big Island Park in Historic American Newspapers

1906 establishments in Minnesota
1911 disestablishments in Minnesota
Amusement parks in Minnesota
Defunct amusement parks in Minnesota